Grove Atlantic, Inc. is an American independent publisher, based in New York City. Formerly styled "Grove/Atlantic, Inc.", it was created in 1993 by the merger of Grove Press and Atlantic Monthly Press. As of 2018 Grove Atlantic calls itself "An Independent Literary Publisher Since 1917". That refers to the official date Atlantic Monthly Press was established by the Boston magazine The Atlantic Monthly.

History and operations
The company's imprints Grove Press, Atlantic Monthly Press, The Mysterious Press, and Black Cat (as of October 2018) publish literary fiction, nonfiction, poetry, drama and translations. Former imprints include Canongate U.S. and Open City.

Its authors include Donna Leon, Kathy Acker, Samuel Beckett, Mark Bowden, William S. Burroughs, Frantz Fanon, Richard Ford, Charles Frazier, Jay McInerney, Jim Harrison, Henry Miller, Kenzaburō Ōe, Harold Pinter, Kay Ryan, John Kennedy Toole, and Jeanette Winterson.

In 1990 the imprint Atlantic Monthly Press was publishing 40 new hardcover titles a year including both fiction and non-fiction.

The company's president and publisher is Morgan Entrekin.  In 2015, Entrekin working with other publishers, booksellers, and literati introduced Literary Hub, an online website for the literary world.

The company's imprints published the books by the 2006 and 2007 recipients of the Man Booker Prize: The Inheritance of Loss (Hamish Hamilton / Atlantic Monthly Press) by Kiran Desai; and The Gathering (Jonathan Cape / Black Cat) by Anne Enright, respectively.

Joan Bingham was the executive editor of Grove Atlantic for nearly 30 years.

Since 2010, the British publishing house Atlantic Books has been publishing a selection of books on behalf of Grove/Atlantic, Inc. in the United Kingdom, using the "Grove Press UK" imprint.

Editors and publishers 

 Gary Fisketjon, Editorial Director 1986-1990
 Ann Godoff, Editor-in-Chief, promoted in 1990
 Carl Navarre, Publisher

See also

 List of companies based in New York City
 List of English-language book publishing companies
 List of English-language small presses

References

External links
 
  – but search WorldCat for the imprint names

American companies established in 1993
Book publishing companies based in New York (state)
Companies based in Manhattan
Greenwich Village
Mass media companies based in New York City
Small press publishing companies